Stanisław Jankowiak (born 8 May 1941 in Zasutowo near Poznań – 11 May 1999 in Poznań) was a Polish sprint canoer who competed in the mid-1960s. He was eliminated in the semifinals of the K-4 1000 m at the 1964 Summer Olympics in Tokyo.

References
 Sports-reference.com profile

1941 births
1999 deaths
Canoeists at the 1964 Summer Olympics
Olympic canoeists of Poland
Polish male canoeists
People from Września County
Sportspeople from Greater Poland Voivodeship